Events from the year 1981 in South Korea.

Incumbents
President: Chun Doo-hwan
Prime Minister: Nam Duck-woo

Events

 September 30 - The International Olympic Committee awards the 1988 Summer Olympics to the city of Seoul, South Korea.

Births
 21 January
 Andy Lee, singer
 Jung Ryeo-won, actress
 5 February - Lee Eon, actor and model
 3 May - U;Nee, singer, rapper, dancer and actress (d. 2007)
 12 May - Kim Tae-woo, singer
 22 August - Jang Hyun-kyu, footballer (d. 2012)
 9 September - Jung Jong-kwan, footballer (d. 2011)
 18 September - JeA, singer and songwriter
 29 September - Nam Hyun-hee, fencer
 2 November - Miryo, rapper, songwriter and record producer
 28 December - Narsha, singer and actress

See also
Years in Japan
Years in North Korea

References

 
South Korea
Years of the 20th century in South Korea
1980s in South Korea
South Korea